The Rugby League Championships (known as the National Leagues between 2003-2008) are the two professional divisions below the Super League, consisting of 12 teams in the Championship and 14 teams in League 1. Promotion and relegation is in use between the Championship and League 1 as well as between the Championship and Super League but not between League 1 and the National Conference League and French Elite One Championship. The RFL can promote teams between the NCL, Elite One Championship and League 1.

History
A second division in rugby league was first formed in 1902 when the RFL Championship split. The RFL Second Division lasted for three seasons and was not played again until 1962 where it was played for just two seasons. It did not become a regular competition until the 1973-74 season.

Another division was added in 1991, the RFL Championship Third Division, which was played for two seasons until 1993. It was then reinstated during the 1995-96 season, the last winter season of rugby league and then played twice more during the summer era until 1997.

In 2003 the Third Division was reinstated again beneath the second division but under the names National League 1, National League 2 and a National League 3 was established Consisting of teams from the Conference. This three division structure lasted until 2008 and the National League 3 was scrapped.

In 2009 the National Leagues were changed to become the Championship and Championship 1. There would be no promotion to Super League and teams would have to apply for a licence every few years for entry to play in Super League. The Grand Final, previously to decide who was promoted now decided the champions. The number of teams in the Championships varied each year as the RFL expanded them and introduced new teams.

In 2015 the RFL reintroduced promotion to Super League and a new league structure, the Super 8s. The Championships were now called the Championship, consisting of 12 teams, and League 1, consisting of 14 teams.

Structure 

The current structure of the Championships consists of two divisions:

Championship

The 12 teams in the Championship play each other home and away plus The Summer Bash over 23 rounds. After the regular season the teams enter in the Super 8s:

The Qualifiers
The top four Championship teams play the bottom four Super League teams. After 7 rounds the top three teams qualify for next seasons Super League and 4th and 5th play each other in the Million Pound Game to decide the fourth team that qualifies for Super League.

Championship Shield
The bottom eight Championship teams play in the Championship Shield, playing 7 more rounds. The top four teams enter in the playoffs to play in the Championship Shield Final. The bottom two teams are relegated to League 1.

League 1

The 16 teams in League 1 play 26 rounds home and away. No teams are relegated but the RFL can promote teams from the National Conference League, Conference League South and Elite One Championship. After the regular season the teams enter in the Super 8s:

League 1 Super 8s
The top eight League 1 teams play each other once more. After 7 rounds the top five teams qualify for the play-offs where two teams are promoted to the Championship:

Promotion Playoff Final
The top two teams play in the promotion playoff final. The winner is promoted to the Championship while the loser plays 5th in the playoffs.

League 1 Playoff
The 3 teams finishing 3rd, 4th and 5th okay in the League 1 Playoff. 3rd plays 4th and 5th plays the loser of the Promotion Playoff Final. The winners of the two games play in the playoff final and the winner will be promoted to the Championship

League 1 Shield
The bottom seven Championship teams play in the League 1 Shield, playing 6 more rounds. The two teams qualify to play in the League 1 Shield Final. No teams are relegated

Clubs

Winners
 
2018 championship London Broncos league 1 york knights

Sponsor

See also

British rugby league system

References

External links

Rugby league competitions in the United Kingdom